The Miss Bermuda is a national Beauty pageant in Bermuda. The pageant was established in 1965 and is the official national pageant to select representative at International pageants.

History
The Miss Bermuda Pageant has once again become one of the leading events on the Bermuda calendar. Under the direction of Milika Trott-Seymour, the Miss Bermuda contestants participate in an educational development program which is geared toward self-improvement and community service. Since 2016 the pageant has been stopped, due to lack financial resource in the island. Here the Miss Bermuda ownership in history:
2011—2015 Milika Trott-Seymour
1972—2010 Wentworth Christopher
1965—1971 Olive Trott

Miss Universe Bermuda
Miss Bermuda was identified to have been held for the first time in 1965. The winner then went on to compete at Miss Universe pageant until 1997. Since then, Bermuda did not compete at any beauty contests. The Miss Bermuda Pageant has an illustrious history, first competing in the Miss Universe Pageant in 1965, with Margaret Hill winning Miss Photogenic in 1970. Gina Swainson was the only Miss Bermuda who placed as the 1st Runner-up at Miss Universe 1979.

Miss World Bermuda

Miss Bermuda began competing in the Miss World Pageant in 1971 seeing Gina Swainson become the 1st and only Miss Bermuda to date to be crowned Miss World in 1979. As of 2011 Bermuda declared to return at pageantry. Although Bermuda did not compete at Miss Universe pageant, due to unknown reasons. The winner will represent Bermuda at Miss World pageant.

Titleholders

Notes
1979: Gina Swainson who was crowned as Miss Bermuda 1979 is the most successful Bermudan Beauty queen at International pageantry. She was crowned as the 1st Runner-up at Miss Universe 1979 in Australia when Maritza Sayalero of Venezuela won the title. After competing at the pageant, Gina continued to join Miss World 1979 in the Great Britain and won the title. In that year, Bermuda made a history for being successful country in two most prestigious pageant in the world.
Elaine Simons, the first holder of the Miss Bermuda title, died on December 25, 2014, in Cincinnati, Ohio. She was 67.

See also
Miss World Bermuda

References

External links
Official website

Bermudian awards
Beauty pageants in Bermuda
Bermuda
Recurring events established in 1965
Bermuda
1965 establishments in Bermuda